The following is a timeline of the history of the city of Nicosia, Cyprus.

Prior to 14th century

 7th C. BCE - City-kingdom called "Ledra."
 280 BCE - Leucos, son of Ptolemy I Soter restored it and "changed its name to Leuteon, Leucotheon or Levcosia".
 4th C. CE - Bishopric established.
 10th C. CE - City becomes capital of island (approximate date); city called "Lefkosia."
 1187 - Nicosia besieged by forces of Richard I of England.
 1192
 11 April: Uprising against Knights Templar.
 City becomes capital of the Kingdom of Cyprus under the French Lusignans.
 1211 - Royal Palace of the Lusignans rebuilt.

14th–18th centuries
 1308 - Notre Dame de Tyre rebuilt.
 1326 - Agia Sofia Cathedral inaugurated.
 1330 - 10 November: Flood.
 1372 - City walls built.
 1489 - Venetians in power.
 1491 - Earthquake.
 1567 - Area of city reduced; Venetian walls and Kyrenia Gate built.
 1570
 9 September: City besieged; Turks in power.
 15 September: Selimiye Mosque established.
 1572 - Büyük Han built.
 1573 - Great Madrasah (school) built.
 1665 - Saint John's Cathedral built.
 1793 - Hadjigeorgakis Kornesios Mansion built.

19th century

 1812
 Ethnographic Museum of Cyprus founded.
 Hellenic School of Nicosia founded. 
 1857 - Faneromeni School established.
 1859 - 29 October: Flood.
 1863 - Rüşdiye (school) opens.
 1872 - Faneromeni Church built.
 1878 - City becomes capital of British Cyprus per Cyprus Convention.
 1882 - Christodoulos Severis becomes mayor of Nicosia Municipality.
 1883 - Cyprus Museum established.
 1885 - Population: 11,513.
 1892 - Sourp Boghos (chapel) built.

20th century

 1901 - Population: 14,752.
 1912 - Population: 16,400.
 1915 - Venetian Column installed in Sarayonu Square.
 1926 - Football Club of Greeks of Nicosia formed.
 1927 - Public Library of Nicosia established.
 1931
 Greek Cypriot Enosis unrest.
 Olympiakos Nicosia football club formed.
 1933 - Criminal Museum founded.
 1937
 Cyprus Folk Museum founded.
 Government House rebuilt.
 1939 - Nicosia General Hospital inaugurated.
 1945 - Cyprus Mail English-language newspaper begins publication.
 1946 - Population: 34,485.
 1948 - Athletic Club Omonia Nicosia (football club) formed.
 1949
 Ledra Palace Hotel in business.
 Neos dēmokratēs newspaper begins publication.
 Nicosia Airport terminal building opens.
 1955 - National Organisation of Cypriot Fighters attack British properties.
 1956
 Palace of the Archbishop built.
 Fence erected between Greek and Turkish communities.
 1958 - Nicosia Turkish Municipality established.
 1959 - Diomedes Skettos becomes mayor.

1960s–1970s

 1960
 City becomes capital of Republic of Cyprus.
 Makhi newspaper begins publication.
 Hadjigeorgakis Kornesios Mansion (museum) opens.
 1963
 City divided by the Green Line.
 Central Bank of Cyprus headquartered in city.
 1967
 Nicosia Municipal Theatre opens.
 20 April: Airplane crash.
 1969
 Nicosia municipal gardens laid out.
 Cyprus Popular Bank branch opens.
 1970 - Theatrical Organization of Cyprus established.
 1971 - Lellos Demetriades becomes mayor.
 1974
 15 July: 1974 Cypriot coup d'état at Presidential Palace.
 20 July: Turkish invasion.
 Battle of Nicosia Airport
 14 August: Turks in power in northern quarter of Nicosia.
 16 August: Tank battle in northern quarter of Nicosia.
 United Nations Buffer Zone established.
 United Nations Peacekeeping Force in Cyprus headquartered in Lakatamia.
 Christoforos Kithreotis becomes mayor, succeeded by Lellos Demetriades.
 1975 - North Nicosia becomes capital of de facto Turkish Federated State of Cyprus.
 1977
 Nicosia International Airport commercial flights end.
 Presidential Palace rebuilt.
 1978 - Makario Stadium opens.

1980s–1990s

 1980
 Lefkotheo sports arena and Pantheon Cineplex open.
 University of Nicosia established.
 1982 - Population: 180,000 (estimate).
 1983 - North Nicosia becomes capital of Turkish Republic of Northern Cyprus.
 1984 - Leventis Municipal Museum of Nicosia established.
 1985 - State Library of Cyprus opens.
 1989 - University of Cyprus established.
 1994 - Nicosia Municipal Arts Centre inaugurated.
 1995 - Museum of the History of Cypriot Coinage established.
 1996
 Cyprus Stock Exchange headquartered in city.
 Cyprus Museum of Natural History inaugurated.
 Shacolas Tower built.
 1999 - GSP Stadium opens.

21st century

 2001
 Nicosia Master Plan enacted (urban planning).
 Population: 254,032 (estimate: 206,200 Greek side; 47,832 Turkish side).
 2002 - Kutlay Erk becomes mayor of North Nicosia.
 2003 - 23 April: Green Line checkpoint at Ledra Palace established.
 2004
 Cyprus International Film Festival begins.
 1 May: Cyprus becomes part of the European Union.
 2005 - Hamam Omerye Baths restored.
 2006
 Cemal Metin Bulutoğluları becomes mayor of North Nicosia.
 Population: 398,293.
 2008
 3 April: Ledra Street crossing reopens.
 Intercultural Centre Nicosia established.
 2011 - 15 October: Occupy Buffer Zone protest begins.
 2012 - 2 January: Constantinos Yiorkadjis becomes mayor.

See also
 History of Nicosia
 List of mayors of Nicosia
 List of mosques in Nicosia
 Timeline of Cypriot history

References

This article incorporates information from the Turkish Wikipedia.

Bibliography

Published in 19th century
 
 
 

Published in 20th century
 
 
 
 
 
 
 

Published in 21st century
 
 
 
 
 
 
 Birtachas, Stathis, Κοινωνία, πολιτισμός και διακυβέρνηση στο βενετικό Κράτος της Θάλασσας: Το παράδειγμα της Κύπρου [Society, Culture and Government in the Venetian Maritime State: The case of Cyprus], Thessaloniki: Vanias, 2011. [in Greek]
 Birtachas, Stathis, Βενετική Κύπρος (1489–1571): Οι Εκθέσεις των αξιωματούχων του ανώτατου διοικητικού σχήματος της κτήσης / Venetian Cyprus: The Reports by the dominion’s supreme administrative officials, Thessaloniki: Epikentro, 2019. [bilingual edition]

External links

 
 Europeana. Items related to Nicosia, various dates.
 Digital Public Library of America. Items related to Nicosia, various dates

Timeline
Nicosia
nicosia
nicosia
Nicosia